Hastula raphanula, common name (little) radish auger, is a species of sea snail, a marine gastropod mollusk in the family Terebridae, the auger snails.

Description
The length of the shell varies between 30 mm and 80 mm.

Distribution
This marine shell occurs off South Africa, Chagos, the Mascarene Basin, the Philippines, New Guinea and the Fiji Islands.

References

 Bratcher T. & Cernohorsky W.O. (1987). Living terebras of the world. A monograph of the recent Terebridae of the world. American Malacologists, Melbourne, Florida & Burlington, Massachusetts. 240pp.
 Sprague. 2004. Four New Species of Terebridae (Mollusca: Gastropoda) from the Philippine Islands. Beagle 20 : 25-29
 Terryn Y. (2007). Terebridae: A Collectors Guide. Conchbooks & NaturalArt. 59pp + plates.
 Bouchet, P.; Fontaine, B. (2009). List of new marine species described between 2002-2006. Census of Marine Life.

External links
 
 Lamarck, J.-B. de. (1822). Histoire naturelle des animaux sans vertèbres, présentant les caractères généraux et particuliers de ces animaux, leur distribution, leurs classes, leurs familles, leurs genres, et la citation des principales espèces qui s'y rapportent; précédée d'une introduction offrant la détermination des caractères essentiels de l'animal, sa distinction du végétal et des autres corps naturel; enfin, l'exposition des principes fondamentaux de la zoologie. Tome septième. 711 pp. Paris (Lamarck
  Sprague J.E. (2004) Four new species of Terebridae (Mollusca: Gastropoda) from the Philippine Islands. Beagle 20: 25–29
 Fedosov, A. E.; Malcolm, G.; Terryn, Y.; Gorson, J.; Modica, M. V.; Holford, M.; Puillandre, N. (2020). Phylogenetic classification of the family Terebridae (Neogastropoda: Conoidea). Journal of Molluscan Studies

Terebridae
Gastropods described in 1822